Metro was a free daily newspaper in Sweden. It was printed in four editions: Stockholm, Gothenburg, Skåne and National, which were distributed in 67 towns and cities throughout the country. The paper was the first European free paper. On 8 August 2019, its cancellation was announced.

History and profile
Metro Stockholm was the first version. The paper was launched on 13 February 1995 and distributed in the Stockholm Metro. Its owner and founding company is Modern Times Group (MTG), a subsidiary of the Swedish conglomerate Kinnevik. The paper is published in tabloid format by Metro International.

For a long time, Metro was the sole free newspaper available in the different metropolitan areas. In 2002, the Bonnier Group launched Stockholm City in the Stockholm region. City expanded into Gothenburg and Malmö in September 2006 and was followed a few weeks later by the Schibsted-backed Punkt SE in all three cities. City Göteborg was closed down in late 2007. In May 2008, Metro had reached an agreement with Schibsted that meant that Punkt SE would be closed down and Schibsted would buy a 35 percent share of Metro Sweden.

In the period of 2001–2002, Metro sold 384,000 copies. Hard hit by the introduction of smart phones, which led morning commuters and other key groups of readers to follow news on cell phones instead of picking up free newspapers, the paper's finances grew increasingly strained in the 2000s. Unable to pay its bills, the newspaper ceased publication in 2019 after briefly attempting to survive as an online-only publication.

Comics
Both the long-featured comic strip Elvis, by Tony Cronstam, and the earlier Rocky, by Martin Kellerman, were first published in Metro Stockholm.

References

External links
Official website

1995 establishments in Sweden
2019 disestablishments in Sweden
Daily newspapers published in Sweden
Defunct daily newspapers
Defunct free daily newspapers
Defunct newspapers published in Sweden
Newspapers established in 1995
Newspapers published in Stockholm
Publications disestablished in 2019
Swedish-language newspapers